4eva N a Day (pronounced as Forever and a Day) is a mixtape by Mississippi rapper and producer Big K.R.I.T. It was released for free digital download on March 5, 2012 under independent record label Cinematic Music Group. The mixtape was released in anticipation of K.R.I.T.'s debut studio album Live from the Underground (2012). It was entirely produced, arranged and mixed by Big K.R.I.T., with assistance from Ralph Cacciurri, and contains 17 tracks with no vocal guest appearances. An extended play containing three songs from the mixtape ("Boobie Miles", "Red Eye" & "Insomnia"), including two new songs, was released on iTunes on April 10, 2012. Upon its release, 4EvaNaDay received critical acclaim from music critics. The mixtape has been downloaded over 236,000 times on professional mixtape site Datpiff.

The first single "Boobie Miles", track 4 on the mixtape, was released on February 1, 2012, over a month before the release of the mixtape. The music video was uploaded to VEVO on March 8, 2012.

Background 
The mixtape was first announced in early December 2011, saying: "Based off the experience of touring in the past year I'm creating this free album from scratch as we speak. I have locked myself back in the studio - 4Eva & a Day coming soon on bigkrit.com". The instrumental tape was released on August 13, 2013.

Critical reception

Upon its release, 4EvaNaDay received critical acclaim from music critics, assuming an aggregate score of 78 out of 100 on Metacritic based on seventeen reviews.

Track listing

4evaNaDay: Road Less Traveled Edition 
The mixtape was released on iTunes as an EP on April 10, 2012. It featured three songs from the mixtape, plus two new songs.

Sample credits
"Yesterday" contains a sample from "Seeing You" by George Duke
"Boobie Miles" contains a sample from "Morning Tears" by MFSB
"4EvaNaDay (Theme)" contains a sample from "Ain't Understanding Mellow" by Jerry Butler and Brenda Lee Eager
"Me And My Old School" contains a sample from "Mother's Theme (Mama)" by Willie Hutch
"1986" contains a sample from "Woman's Gotta Have It" by Bobby Womack
"Sky Club" contains a sample from "Like A Tattoo" by Sade
"Red Eye" contains a sample from "Amen, Brother" by The Winstons
"Down & Out" contains a sample from "Bridge Through Time" by Lonnie Liston Smith
"Temptation" contains a sample from "The New Style" by Beastie Boys
"Handwriting" contains a sample from "The Handwriting Is On The Wall" by Ann Peebles
"The Alarm" contains a sample from "Do What You Wanna Do" by The Dramatics

Personnel 
Credits adapted from mixtape back cover.

 Big K.R.I.T. — primary artist, producer, mixer, arrangement
 Jonny Shipes — executive producer, management, A&R
 Sha Money — executive producer, A&R
 Steve-D — marketing
 Jen McDaniels — management
 Mike Hartnett — guitar
 Willie Brinson — saxophone
 Ralph Cacciurri — mixer

References 

2012 mixtape albums
Big K.R.I.T. albums
Albums produced by Big K.R.I.T.
Cinematic Music Group albums